"Daddy" is a song by American rapper Blueface, released on June 14, 2019. It is the second single from his second EP Dirt Bag (2019), and features American rapper Rich the Kid. The song was produced by Scum Beatz and Mike Crook, both of whom also wrote the song with the rappers.

Composition 
The track samples Blueface's "Thotiana" and interpolates his song "ID" as well as "Uno" by American rapper Ambjaay. Joshua Espinoza of Complex has described the track to be "reminiscent" of "Thotiana", as it features "an extremely catchy, club-ready beat and braggadocios lines about sex and designer goods." Blueface lists off many famous luxury designers in the song. "Daddy" has been regarded as a summer-themed song.

Music video 
The music video was released on June 20, 2019. Directed by Malcolm Jones and produced by Monica A. Young and Jai Santiago, it features Blueface and Rich the Kid throwing a pool party with twerking bikini-clad models. The rappers also show off shoes and bags from several brands throughout.

Charts

Certifications

References 

2019 singles
2019 songs
Blueface songs
Rich the Kid songs
Songs written by Rich the Kid
Cash Money Records singles
Republic Records singles